Join in the Sound is the first studio album from Brothers McClurg. Integrity Music released the album on July 31, 2012. They worked with Joseph Secchiaroli, in the production of this album.

Critical reception

Awarding the album five stars for Worship Leader, Jeremy Armstrong states, "this band of brothers mixed passion and creativity with their powerful devotional songwriting chops to offer one of the best debut releases this year." Brendan O'Regan, rating the album an eight out of ten from Cross Rhythms, writes, "the lyrics are well crafted and one is left with a thoroughly engaging album". Giving the album four stars at New Release Today, Mary Nikkel says, "The songs are framed by strong, smooth vocals, mellow guitar work, and songwriting that is powerful in its simplicity." Jono Davies, indicating in a four star review by Louder Than the Music, describes, "the album is very relaxed, it's something to put on during a nice evening in front of the fire with a book."

Track listing

Chart performance

References

2012 debut albums